Job Vile (1845 – 6 December 1905) was an independent conservative Member of Parliament in New Zealand, representing the Manawatu electorate between 1902 and 1905. He served as the first chairman of Pahiatua Country Council, and the first mayor of Pahiatua.

Early life and family
Born in North Curry, Somerset, England, in 1845, Vile was the son of John Vile and Ann Foster. In 1856, the family emigrated to New Zealand on the Anne Wilson, arriving in Wellington and first settling in the Hutt Valley. However, after flooding in 1858, they moved to the Wairarapa, eventually purchasing land to farm near present-day Carterton.

On 15 June 1866, Vile married Helen Bland Rayner, and the couple went on to have 12 children. The trade unionist and politician Sonja Davies was Vile's great-granddaughter.

Business activities
By 1873, Vile was in business as a carrier, operating coaches between Wellington and Wairarapa. Over the years the length of his run decreased as the railway line was extended. Between 1893 and 1895, he ran a coach line servicing the coastal route from Hāwera to New Plymouth. Vile purchased the Hastings Standard newspaper in 1897, and his son, Arthur, became the manager and editor. However, the paper was sold in 1899.

Political career

Local politics
Vile began his involvement in local-body politics as one of the first members of the Masterton Borough Council after the town achieved that status in 1877. He later served as the first chairman of the Pahiatua County Council from 1888 to 1890, and continued as a council member for a further three years. He was the first mayor of the borough of Pahiatua, serving two separate terms: from 1892 to 1893; and from January to November in 1895.

A long-time temperance advocate, Vile served as "chief ruler" of the Pahiatua Rechabite Lodge.

New Zealand Parliament

At the 1902 general election, Vile stood as an independent for the Manawatu electorate, defeating the incumbent, John Stevens of the Liberal Party, by 1691 votes to 1515. During his term he criticised the government, and in particular wasteful public spending. He again contested the seat at the 1905 election against John Stevens, who this time defeated Vile 2404 votes to 2045, a majority of 359. A third candidate, Oswald Gardner, standing as an independent, garnered 233 votes. However, Vile died suddenly from heart failure at Marton on the day of the election (6 December 1905), before the results were released. He was buried at Mangatainoka Pahiatua Cemetery.

References

1845 births
1905 deaths
People from Taunton Deane (district)
English emigrants to New Zealand
Mayors of places in Manawatū-Whanganui
Local politicians in New Zealand
New Zealand temperance activists
New Zealand businesspeople
Members of the New Zealand House of Representatives
New Zealand MPs for North Island electorates
Independent MPs of New Zealand
Unsuccessful candidates in the 1905 New Zealand general election